Pelin may refer to:

People 
 Elin Pelin (1877–1949), Bulgarian writer
 Pelin Aroğuz (born 1997), Turkish volleyball player 
 Pelin Batu (born 1978), Turkish actress and television personality
 Pelin Çelik (born 1982), Turkish volleyball player
 Pelin Gündeş Bakır (born 1972), Turkish politician and academic
 Pelin Karahan (born 1984), Turkish actress
 Pelin Kivrak (born 1988), Turkish fiction writer
 Tomislav Pelin (born 1981), Croatian football player
 Tudorel Pelin (born 1969), Romanian football player

Other uses 
 Pelin wine, wine mixed with wormwood
 Pelin (village), a village in Bulgaria
 Elin Pelin (town), a town in Bulgaria

Turkish feminine given names